David J. Mayernik (born June 15, 1952) is a former Democratic member of the Pennsylvania House of Representatives. 
He is a 1970 graduate of North Hills High School. He earned an A.A. from the Allegheny Community College in 1972 and a B.A. from the University of Pittsburgh in 1974. In 1975, he graduated from the Allegheny County Police Academy. He earned an M.A. from University of Pittsburgh in 1981 and a J.D. from Widener University School of Law in 1993.

He was first elected to represent the 29th legislative district in 1982. During his legislative career, he had eleven prime sponsored bills and twenty-one amendments signed into law by four governors.  In the decennial legislative redistricting following the 2000 census, his district was "diced" into seven other districts and moved across the state from Allegheny County to Bucks County, Pennsylvania by the House Democratic Caucus in the 2002 legislative re-apportionment plan, leaving him "scant chance of re-election." Democratic leaders were unhappy that he had crossed party lines and otherwise disobeying caucus leaders. He said, "They terminated me. This was Politics 101. It sends a message: Don't step out of line. Right now, I expect to be running. I'm just not sure where I'll be running." Instead, he retired prior to the 2002 election.

In a 2002 PoliticsPA Feature story designating politicians with yearbook superlatives, he was named the "Toughest to Work For."

He has served as an adjunct professor at the University of Pittsburgh Graduate School of Public and International Affairs and as an instructor at the Allegheny County Police Academy. He is currently practicing law with the Pittsburgh law firm of Eckert Seamans.

References

External links
 official PA House profile

Living people
Democratic Party members of the Pennsylvania House of Representatives
1952 births
Politicians from Pittsburgh